"Can't Get Enough" is a song by Canadian recording artist Tamia. It was written by LaShawn Daniels, Fred Jerkins III, and Rodney "Darkchild" Jerkins for her fourth album Between Friends (2006), while production was helmed by the latter. The song was released as the album's lead single in 2006. It reached number 26 on the US Billboard Hot R&B/Hip-Hop Songs chart.

Music video
An accompanying music video for "Can't Get Enough" was directed by American filmmaker Darren Grant. It marked his second collaboration with Tamia. Filmed in Miami on October 2, 2006, Tamia cited the clip as one of her "favorite videos," telling Singersroom: "I’m just really excited about the video. I think it’s beautiful. Darren did an awesome job [...] It’s a different look for me, I dyed my hair dark. The make-up is very minimal. It’s beautiful in a natural sort of way. Natural to me, as in three hours of make-up!"

Track listing

Credits and personnel 
Credits adapted from the liner notes of Between Friends.

Anesha Birchett – backing vocals
LaShawn Daniels – writer
Brian Gardner – mastering
Tamia Hill – vocals, writer
Fred Jerkins III – writer

Rodney Jerkins – instruments, production, writer
Dexter Simmons – mixing
Jeff Villanueva – recording
Jon Webb – bass guitar

Charts

Weekly charts

Year-end charts

References

2006 singles
Music videos directed by Darren Grant
Tamia songs
Songs written by Rodney Jerkins
Song recordings produced by Rodney Jerkins
2006 songs
Songs written by LaShawn Daniels
Songs written by Fred Jerkins III